Kelway is a surname. Notable people with the surname include:

Joseph Kelway ( 1702–1782), English organist
Simon Kelway (died 1623), English politician
Thomas Kelway ( 1695–1744), English organist, brother of Joseph

See also
McKelway